Louis William Polchow (March 14, 1880 – August 15, 1912) was a pitcher in Major League Baseball. He pitched for the Cleveland Bronchos in 1902.

Career
Louis Polchow was born in Mankato, Minnesota. He started his professional baseball career in 1900, at the age of 20, in the Western League. During the next two seasons, Polchow pitched for the Evansville River Rats of the Illinois–Indiana–Iowa League. He was acquired by the Cleveland Bronchos in late 1902 and made one start for them. Polchow allowed five earned runs in eight innings and took the loss; that was his only experience in the major leagues.

Polchow played in several minor leagues after 1902. After stops in the Southern Association and South Atlantic League, he stayed in the New York State League from 1906 to 1910 as a starting pitcher. In 1908, he went 12–11 for the Utica Pent-Ups. Polchow went just 8–16 in 1910, however, and retired from organized baseball. He had a career minor league record of 58–73.

Polchow died of Bright's disease in 1912. He is still the only person born in Mankato, Minnesota, to ever play in Major League Baseball.

References

External links

1880 births
1912 deaths
Major League Baseball pitchers
Cleveland Bronchos players
Des Moines Hawkeyes players
Evansville River Rats players
Montgomery Black Sox players
Augusta Tourists players
Macon Highlanders players
Montgomery Senators players
Scranton Miners players
Utica Pent-Ups players
Elmira Colonels players
Baseball players from Minnesota
Deaths from nephritis